Fernando Silva dos Santos (born 18 May 1991) is a Brazilian footballer who plays as a winger for FK Borec.

Career
In June 2013, Silva signed with Bulgarian side Slavia Sofia on a three-year deal.

Statistics

Honours
Pelister
Macedonian Cup: 2016–17

References

Desportivo das Aves rescinde contrato com três jogadores, futebol365.pt, 18 May 2016

External links

1991 births
Living people
Brazilian footballers
Brazilian expatriate footballers
Associação Atlética Caldense players
ABC Futebol Clube players
PFC Slavia Sofia players
Şanlıurfaspor footballers
C.D. Aves players
FC Montana players
FK Pelister players
FK Renova players
Clube Atlético Juventus players
FK Borec players
Campeonato Brasileiro Série B players
TFF First League players
First Professional Football League (Bulgaria) players
Liga Portugal 2 players
Macedonian First Football League players
Association football midfielders
Brazilian expatriate sportspeople in Bulgaria
Brazilian expatriate sportspeople in Greece
Brazilian expatriate sportspeople in Portugal
Brazilian expatriate sportspeople in Turkey
Brazilian expatriate sportspeople in North Macedonia
Expatriate footballers in Bulgaria
Expatriate footballers in Greece
Expatriate footballers in Portugal
Expatriate footballers in Turkey
Expatriate footballers in North Macedonia